The 2022 Dow Tennis Classic was a professional tennis tournament played on indoor hard courts. It was the twenty-eighth edition of the tournament which was also part of the 2022 WTA 125 tournaments. It took place at the Greater Midland Tennis Center in Midland, Michigan, United States between 31 October and 6 November 2022.

Champions

Singles

  Caty McNally def.  Anna-Lena Friedsam, 6–3, 6–2.

Doubles

  Asia Muhammad /  Alycia Parks def.  Anna-Lena Friedsam /  Nadiia Kichenok, 6–2, 6–3

Singles main-draw entrants

Seeds

 1 Rankings are as of 24 October 2022.

Other entrants
The following players received wildcards into the singles main draw:
  Eugenie Bouchard
  Madison Brengle
  Sofia Kenin
  Maria Mateas
  Peyton Stearns
  Zhang Shuai

The following players received entry from the qualifying draw:
  Kayla Day
  Elvina Kalieva
  Robin Montgomery
  Katherine Sebov

The following player received entry as a lucky loser:
  Sophie Chang

Withdrawals
Before the tournament
  Fernanda Contreras Gómez → replaced by  Sachia Vickery
  Anna Kalinskaya → replaced by  Carol Zhao
  Marta Kostyuk → replaced by  Robin Anderson
  Rebecca Peterson → replaced by  Anna-Lena Friedsam
  Lesia Tsurenko → replaced by  Asia Muhammad
  Donna Vekić → replaced by  Louisa Chirico
  Katie Volynets → replaced by  Ashlyn Krueger
  Yuan Yue → replaced by  Sophie Chang

Doubles entrants

Seeds 

 1 Rankings as of 24 October 2022.

Other entrants 
The following pair received a wildcard into the doubles main draw:
   Karolína Beránková  /  Elizabeth  Coleman

References

External links
 2022 Dow Tennis Classic at WTAtennis.com
 Official website

2022 WTA 125 tournaments
2022 in American tennis
November 2022 sports events in the United States
2022 in sports in Michigan